Leroy Resodihardjo (born 4 March 1987) is a Dutch footballer who plays for VV Smitshoek, as a midfielder.

Career
Born in Leidschendam, Resodihardjo has played for ADO Den Haag, Almere City, SVV Scheveningen and VV Smitshoek.

Personal life
He is of Indonesian descent.

References

1987 births
Living people
Dutch footballers
ADO Den Haag players
Almere City FC players
SVV Scheveningen players
Eredivisie players
Eerste Divisie players
Tweede Divisie players
Derde Divisie players
People from Leidschendam
Dutch people of Indonesian descent
Association football midfielders
VV Smitshoek players
Vierde Divisie players
Footballers from South Holland